Ectoedemia subnitescens is a moth of the family Nepticulidae. It was described by Edward Meyrick in 1937. It is known from South Africa (it was described from the Cape Province).

References

Endemic moths of South Africa
Nepticulidae
Moths of Africa
Moths described in 1937